Botoroaga is a commune in Teleorman County, Muntenia, Romania. It is composed of five villages: Botoroaga, Călugăru, Târnava, Tunari and Valea Cireșului.

References

Communes in Teleorman County
Localities in Muntenia